The men's javelin throw event at the 1955 International University Sports Week was held in San Sebastián on 14 August 1955.

Medalists

Results

Qualification

Final

References

Athletics at the 1955 Summer International University Sports Week
1955